Fedor Viktorovich Trikolich (born 2 March 1985) is a visually impaired Russian sprinter. He competed at the 2008 and 2012 Paralympics and won two gold and a silver medal in 2012. He is also a multiple world and European champion, taking nine medals over five tournaments.

References

External links 

 

1985 births
Living people
Athletes from Saint Petersburg
Russian male sprinters
Paralympic athletes of Russia
Athletes (track and field) at the 2008 Summer Paralympics
Athletes (track and field) at the 2012 Summer Paralympics
Paralympic gold medalists for Russia
Paralympic silver medalists for Russia
Medalists at the 2012 Summer Paralympics
Medalists at the World Para Athletics Championships
Medalists at the World Para Athletics European Championships
Paralympic medalists in athletics (track and field)
Paralympic sprinters
Visually impaired sprinters